Bury and Radcliffe was a parliamentary constituency centred on the towns of Bury and Radcliffe in North West England.  It returned one Member of Parliament (MP)  to the House of Commons of the Parliament of the United Kingdom.

The constituency was created for the 1950 general election, and abolished for the 1983 general election, when it was split into two new constituencies – Bury North and Bury South.

Boundaries

The County Borough of Bury, the Borough of Radcliffe, and the Urban District of Tottington.

Members of Parliament

Election results

Elections in the 1950s

Elections in the 1960s

Elections in the 1970s

References

Parliamentary constituencies in North West England (historic)
Constituencies of the Parliament of the United Kingdom established in 1950
Constituencies of the Parliament of the United Kingdom disestablished in 1983
Politics of the Metropolitan Borough of Bury